Odsey was a judicial and taxation subdivision (a "hundred") of Hertfordshire, in the northeast of the county, that existed from the 10th to the 19th century.

It comprised the following parishes: Ardeley, Ashwell, Broadfield, Bygrave, Caldecote, Clothall, Cottered, Hinxworth, Kelshall, Newnham, Radwell, Reed, Royston, Rushden, Sandon, Therfield and Wallington. Newnham was transferred to Cashio Hundred some time between 1086 and 1286.

The hundred appears to have been named after Odsey Grange, part of the parish of Guilden Morden, Cambridgeshire, indicating that the hundred originally included additional territory to the north.

References 

Hundreds of Hertfordshire